Claude Germany is a French Antillean musician, known as a player of chouval bwa.

References 

French musicians
Living people
Year of birth missing (living people)